Linear city may refer to:
 Linear settlement
 Linear city (Soria design), an 1882 concept of city planning
 Linear city (Graves and Eisenman design), a 1965 proposal for a settlement in New Jersey
 The linear city model of Hotelling's law

See also
 The Line, Saudi Arabia